Rodrigo de Sosa (1600s–1669) was a military and alcalde of province of Cordoba.

Biography 
Born in Córdoba, present Argentina, was the son of the Portuguese Ruy de Sosa and Gregoria Peralta and maternal grandson of Blas de Peralta. Rodrigo Sosa married in Buenos Aires to Margarita Monsalve daughter of Juan Montes de Oca and Francisca de Santa Cruz daughter of Francisco García Romero.

The Cap. Rodrigo Sosa served as councilman in cabildo of Córdoba. In 1635 was appointed alcalde de la Santa Hermandad.

References

External links
Archive.org

People from Buenos Aires
Spanish colonial governors and administrators
1669 deaths
17th-century Argentine people
Year of birth unknown